Vittorio Mazzoni della Stella (born 21 May 1941, in Siena) is an Italian politician.

Member of the Italian Socialist Party, he was elected Mayor of Siena on 20 September 1983, and re-elected for a second term in 1988.

He worked as administrator for the bank Monte dei Paschi di Siena.

References

See also
List of mayors of Siena

1941 births
Living people
Mayors of Siena
Italian Socialist Party politicians